Gerhardus Phillipus Johannes "Gerrit" Smith (born 12 February 1988 in Pretoria) is a South African rugby union player who last played for the  in the Currie Cup and in the Rugby Challenge. He is a utility back and can play as a fly-half, centre, winger or full-back.

Career

Youth and amateur
He represented the  team in the 2007 Under-19 Provincial Championship competition and for the  team in the 2008 and 2009 Under-21 Provincial Championship competitions.

Falcons
This turned out to be his one and only appearance for them.

SWD Eagles

References

South African rugby union players
Living people
1988 births
Rugby union players from Pretoria
Falcons (rugby union) players
SWD Eagles players
Rugby union fullbacks